Sisters in Resistance is a 2000 documentary by Maia Wechsler that tells the story of four young Frenchwomen who fought against the German occupation of France during World War II. The film won Outstanding Documentary by the Academy Award Screening Committee and won Best Documentary in the Woman in Cinema Film Festival.

Summary
"Indignation can move mountains. It's the strongest emotion," says Germaine Tillion, an anthropology student and active leader in the resistance movement in France, "Face with crime and cruelty, something wells up within you. I call it indignation. It's twofold: anger and revolution, but also a feeling that justice is on your side and the person before you represents evil."

When Germany invaded France in May 1940, a small group of women recognized the threat that the Nazis posed and took a stand to fight for their country’s freedom. Sisters in Resistance follows Jacqueline Pery, Anise Postel-Vinay, Germaine Tillion, and Geneviève de Gaulle-Anthonioz - the niece of Charles de Gaulle – through their heroic war-time experiences. At the brink of womanhood, most of them were not yet twenty-years old, they let their moral foundation inform their actions. While much of the population stood idly by, these young women made protest flyers, tore down Nazi flags, delivered secret war correspondence, and hid Jews away from the Nazis.

All four woman clearly recognized the danger they were putting themselves into, but that didn't stop them from doing what they believed was right. Jaqueline says she remembers the first time she saw a small Jewish child branded by a bright yellow Star of David. She was disgusted and horrified. It was then that she realized, "I was ready to lose my life. I had to fight."

But their actions had consequences. All four were arrested, imprisoned, tortured, and sent to Ravensbrück concentration camp. There, these Gentiles suffered alongside the Jews. Just as their solidarity gave them courage to fight against German occupation, so too simple acts of friendship and kindness helped them survive in Ravensbrück. Every day Germaine would give her friend a little piece of her bread, saying insistently, "Take it. You're young. You'll survive, marry, and have ten children."

Although they witnessed death all around them, all four friends survived. They said the inhumanity they experienced during the Holocaust only encouraged them to continue fighting for human rights and justice. After being released from  the concentration camp, they went off in different directions, but continued to work for humanitarianism. Jacqueline moved to America and lectured to students about her war-time experiences, Germaine denounced France's military use of torture in the Algerian War for independence, Anise documented the use of poison gas in Ravensbrück concentration amp, and Geneviève lead an international movement to help the poor and the less fortunate.

At the end of the documentary, Geneviève quotes French writer André Malraux, saying, "The only response to absolute evil is fraternity."

Production

Reception

See also
Resistance movements
Resistance during World War II
French resistance

Other documentaries about Holocaust survivors:
Pola's March
Marion's Triumph
Boys of Buchenwald
A Story about a Bad Dream

References

External links
PBS's website for Sisters of the Resistance
Women Make Movies page for Sisters of the Resistance
Press Release
'Sisters in Resistance' withstood Ravensbrück
The Jewish Channel's blog about Sisters in Resistance
 

2000 films
American biographical films
Documentary films about the Holocaust
American documentary films
Films about the French Resistance
2000 documentary films
Ravensbrück concentration camp
Films set in France
Films set in Germany
2000s American films